Persea liebmannii is a species of plant in the family Lauraceae. It is native to  Mexico, Guatemala, and Belize.

References

liebmannii
Trees of Mexico
Trees of Guatemala
Trees of Belize
Flora of the Sierra Madre Oriental
Cloud forest flora of Mexico